Come Along with Me is a collection of writings by author Shirley Jackson.

Come Along with Me may also refer to:

"Come Along with Me" (Adventure Time), the series finale to the animated show Adventure Time
"Come Along with Me", a song by Bitter:Sweet from the album Drama